Pastorela is a 2011 Mexican Christmas black comedy film directed by Emilio Portes and starring Joaquín Cosío, Eduardo España, Carlos Cobos and Ana Serradilla. It won the Ariel Award for Best Picture in 2012.

Premise 
The judicial agent of the federal police Jesús "Chucho" Juárez lives with his daughter Magdalena in the neighborhood of de San Miguel de Nenepilco, Mexico City, and annually plays the role of the devil in the parish pastorela organized by father Benito. When the deputy prosecutor is assassinated, Chucho gets occupied with the case and does not realize that father Benito has died of a heart attack while having sex with one of the nuns; and that the new priest, Edmundo Posadas, has decided not to include him in the pastorela, instead giving his role to Vulmaro, Chucho's compadre. After years of playing the devil, Chucho is not going to give up his role easily, so he will have to face off in a classic fight of good versus evil to claim his part in the play.

Cast
 Joaquín Cosío as Jesús "Chucho" Juárez 
  as priest Edmundo Posadas
  as Vilmaro "El Compadre" Villafuente 
 Ana Serradilla as a nun
 Dagoberto Gama as a judicial commander 
 Héctor Jiménez as a possessed man
 José Semafi — as "El Tuerto"
 Ernesto Yáñez as an altar boy
 Eduardo Manzano as a Cardinal
 Ruben Cristiany as the Archbishop of the Archdiocese of Mexico
 Osami Kowano as priest Benito
 Melissa Bahnsen as Magdalena
  as doctor Godínez

Awards and nominations 
Pastorela received a total of 14 nominations for the Ariel Awards, and won eight of these.

References

External links 
 

2011 films
2010s Spanish-language films
Mexican black comedy films
Films set in Mexico City
Films shot in Mexico City
2011 black comedy films
2010s Mexican films